Anisochromia is a marked variability in the color density of erythrocytes (red blood cells), which indicates unequal hemoglobin content among the red blood cells.

A potential cause of anisochromatism is sideroblastic anemia. It can also be seen after blood transfusions are administered, because blood products from multiple people may have different chromacity.

See also 
 Anisocytosis

References

Blood tests